The John O'Groat was a named passenger train operating in the United Kingdom.

History
The service was introduced on 26 July 1936 by the London, Midland and Scottish Railway. It was given to the 4.10pm train from Inverness to Wick and Thurso.

The name was abandoned at the outbreak of the Second World War in 1939, and not re-adopted afterwards.

References

Named passenger trains of the London, Midland and Scottish Railway
Rail transport in Scotland
Railway services introduced in 1936
1936 establishments in England